CyberArts International was a series of conferences dealing with emerging technologies that took place during years 1990, 1991, and 1992 in Los Angeles and Pasadena, California. The gatherings brought together artists and developers in all types of new media, including software engineers, electronic musicians, and graphic artists to explore what was a new field at the time, digital media collaborations. 

A fourth, reunion, exposition was held in San Francisco in September 2001 but saw its attendance undercut by the transportation difficulties which followed the September 11 terrorist attacks.

The conferences dealt with the interrelationship between computer technology, visual design, music and sound, education, and entertainment.

History

Background 

CyberArts International was a series of three annual conferences and exhibitions held in Southern California from 1990 to 1992, focusing upon emerging technologies and techniques for artists working to build interactivity or in the multimedia field. The expositions were originally developed by Dominic Milano, editor of Keyboard Magazine, who served as conference chair, in collaboration with Robert B. Gelman, event producer and Director of Business Development for Miller Freeman Expositions and co-produced by Linda Jacobson, who later edited the anthology CyberArts: Exploring Art and Technology, published by Miller Freeman, Inc. in 1992. 

Other paid staff members and volunteers also assisted in event preparation, including arts organizations YLEM and EZTV, as well as author and publisher Michael Gosney of Verbum Magazine, who later co-produced a series of Digital Be-Ins with Robert Gelman from 1993 to 1998.

The notion of cyberarts

The term cyberarts is a portmanteau combining the root word of cybernetics, dealing with the study of control systems in machines and human nervous systems, and the word for the broad creative fields dealing with the creation of objects of form, beauty, and expression. Inspiration for the CyberArts International conferences revolved around the artistic implications of the rapidly changing technologies related to computers, input devices, digital storage, networking, and reproduction — parallel technologies that were revolutionizing the traditional visual and sonic arts and making possible new forms of artistic expression.

As one enthusiast noted, these new and changing computer tools served to "enhance the creative process by making it easy to experiment with color schemes, sound layers, scene transitions, 3D models, photo retouching, and animated characters."

Convention structure

The motivating concept behind the CyberArts International conventions was a desire to bring together artists working in the various new media and the firms producing tools for such work, blending artistic exhibition with trade show. During the day the gatherings featured interactive exhibitions and aisles of traditional exhibit booths found at any ordinary trade show. There were in addition numerous interactive art installations, including some that could be ridden like amusement park rides and others which were for their time cutting edge demonstrations of interactive games. Iconic technologies of the future such as CD-ROMs and virtual reality were demonstrated to participants at these tech expositions. The electronic publisher Jaime Levy exhibited and sold her floppy disk magazine "Cyber Rag" that was created in HyperCard. 

The CyberArts International festivals also featured lectures and workshops dealing with the process of creation of new media art forms, allowing discussion about the rationale and implications of such work. There was also spontaneous collaborative art and performance in real-time.

Evening concerts were also held in conjunction with the CyberArts International festivals, featuring performances by musicians interested in new technologies such as Jaron Lanier, Stanley Jordan, Todd Rundgren, Tod Machover, and D'Cuckoo.

Events

Three annual conferences were held from 1990 to 1992. These were covered by local and national media, including the Los Angeles Times, Macworld, PC World, and Amusement Today, which reported on various aspects of the eclectic events. Media accounts likened the concerts associated with the conferences to a "Techno-Woodstock" or a "visionary party."

CyberArts International X, a 10-year reunion commemorating the original CyberArts International events was hosted at The Exploratorium in San Francisco on September 15 and 16, 2001. All of the original participants were invited to return and update one another on the developments of the decade past, and a few new art/technology innovations were to be unveiled. The September 11 terrorist attacks intervened, dramatically impacting the American air transportation system and preventing the participation of some scheduled conference participants. 

Many key figures, including Fiorella Terenzi of Italy, were limited to participation via web-conference, marred by the relatively low bandwidth of the day.  A Haiku Wall was created to allow attendees to express themselves, and performances featured a number of emerging artists of that time.

Event dates

See also

Boston Cyberarts Festival
Ars Electronica

Footnotes

Further reading 

 Michael Czeiszperger and Atau Tanaka, "CyberArts International," Computer Music Journal, vol. 16, no. 3 (Autumn 1992), pp. 92-96. In JSTOR
 Kit Galloway and Sherrie Rabinowitz, "Welcome to 'Electronic Cafe International': A Nice Place for Hot Coffe, Iced Tea, and Virtual Space: Pictorially Enhanced Version," in Linda Jacobson (ed.), Cyberarts: Exploring Art & Technology. San Francisco, CA: Miller Freeman, Inc., 1992.
 Cynthia Goodman, Digital Visions. New York: Harry N. Abrams, 1997.
 Diane Haithman,  "Festival '90: Reality's Different at CyberArts Convention," Los Angeles Times, Sept. 8, 1990.
 Linda Jacobson (ed.), Cyberarts: Exploring Art & Technology. San Francisco, CA: Miller Freeman, Inc., 1992. .
 Theodor Holm Nelson, "Virtual World Without End" in Proceedings of Cyber Arts International Conference, September 1990.
 Frank Popper, Art of the Electronic Age. New York: Harry N. Abrams, 1993.
 Atau Tanaka, "CyberArts International," Computer Music Journal, vol. 15, no. 1 (Spring 1991), pp. 55-58. In JSTOR

External links 
 Official website
 "CyberArts International 1991 Event Schedule," Miller Freeman, Inc.
 "CyberArts International 1992 Event Schedule," Miller Freeman, Inc.
 Bruce Damer, "CyberArts International X Conference Photo Album," www.damer.com/
 EZTV, "History," CyberSpace Gallery, www.eztvmedia.com/
 YLEM: Artists Using Science and Technology, "A Detailed History of YLEM," www.ylem.org/

Art festivals in the United States
Technology conferences
Technology conventions
Computer art
Digital media organizations
Computing culture
New media art festivals
Electronic music festivals in the United States